Jawor is a peak and massif in the Sanocko-Turczańskie Mountains, located next to the Lake Solina.  Łoboźnicy valley is surrounding the peak and Lake Solina by the Gulf of Teleśnicka, while to the East the Żuków mountain range is separated by a pass at 530 metres.

From the top of the main peak where the TON Góra Jawor radio mast is located, two ridges from the North-Eastern and South-Western points come off with culminations of 702 and 608 metres. By the side of the Jawor reservoir is a complex of leisure facilities and buildings. Łobozew Dolny has an asphalt road connection which weaves around the mountain up to 700 metres, and steadily declines down to the complex.

On the South-Western slope, close by next to the peak, is situated a ski lift. There are no set tourist trails along the massif.

References

Mountains of Poland